Club Baloncesto Inmobanco, also known as Club Baloncesto Tempus, was a professional basketball club based in Madrid.

History
CB Inmobanco was founded as the reserve team of Real Madrid with the name of Castilla-Vallehermoso. The club separated from Real on 1978, after promoting to the first division. It played two Copa del Rey finals and the Korać Cup in the 1980–81 season. During its history, it played in several arenas of Pozuelo de Alarcón and Madrid.

Finally, the club disappeared in 1983 after not having a sponsor to complete the budget for the next season. It was going to play Cup Winners' Cup.

Season by season

Notable players
 José Manuel Beirán
 Fernando Romay
 José Luis "Indio" Díaz

References

Defunct basketball teams in Spain
Basketball teams established in 1974
Basketball teams in the Community of Madrid
Sports teams in Madrid
Basketball teams disestablished in 1983
1974 establishments in Spain
1983 disestablishments in Spain